Ayodeji Malcolm Guite (born 12 November 1957) is an English poet, singer-songwriter, Anglican priest, and academic. Born in Nigeria to British expatriate parents, Guite earned degrees from Cambridge and Durham universities. His research interests include the intersection of religion and the arts, and the examination of the works of J. R. R. Tolkien, C. S. Lewis and Owen Barfield, and British poets such as Samuel Taylor Coleridge. He was a Bye-Fellow and chaplain of Girton College, Cambridge, and associate chaplain of St Edward King and Martyr, Cambridge. On several occasions, he has taught as visiting faculty at several colleges and universities in England and North America.

Guite is the author of five books of poetry, including two chapbooks and three full-length collections, as well as several books on Christian faith and theology. Guite has a decisively simple, formalist style in poems, many of which are sonnets, and he stated that his aim is to "be profound without ceasing to be beautiful". Guite performs as a singer and guitarist fronting the Cambridgeshire-based blues, rhythm and blues, and rock band Mystery Train.

Early life and education 
Guite was born on 12 November 1957 in Ibadan, Oyo State, in Nigeria. At birth, he was given the first name Ayodeji which is a Yoruba tribal name meaning "the second joy". According to Guite, the name was suggested to his mother by the Yoruba nurse who attended to her through a difficult childbirth and whom Guite states probably saved both his and his mother's life. His parents were British expatriates living in Nigeria where his father was a Methodist lay preacher who travelled around the country evangelising. His father also taught as lecturer in Classics at the University of Ibadan. According to Guite, after ten years in Nigeria, his father "ever the wanderer, went and got a job in Canada, where we then moved".

Although his family had settled in Canada, his parents thought he was losing his British identity and decided to enrol him in boarding school in England where he spent his teenage years. He attended the Haberdashers' Aske's Boys' School in Elstree, Hertfordshire. He would describe the boarding school experience as terrible, an "atmosphere of guilt, oppression and general alienation" where he strayed from his childhood Christian faith. In its place, Guite embraced a "rational scientific materialism" coloured by B.F. Skinner's behaviourism and the existentialism of Jean-Paul Sartre and Samuel Beckett.

During these years, Guite states that he was not sure whether he belonged in England or in Canada, having questions about how he identified himself. In the end, however, he decided that he belonged in England after winning a scholarship to Pembroke College, Cambridge to read English and after discovering "real ale"—something he says "they don't have properly in Canada at all". Guite adds that after these two events he "fell in love with Cambridge, and I've never quite escaped its gravitational pull". Guite returned gradually to his Christian faith, first under the influence of beauty in the poetry of John Keats and Percy Bysshe Shelley and visits to historical sites that had deep religious significance—Rome, Glencolmcille, and Scotland's Iona. After delving into the works of Keats and Shelley, Guite decided to begin writing poetry. In his final year of undergraduate study, Guite states that he had a religious experience writing a literary paper analysing the Psalms that he likened to a conversion experience. He chose to be confirmed in the Church of England shortly after.

Guite graduated from Cambridge with a Bachelor of Arts (BA)—later automatically upgraded to Master of Arts (MA (Cantab))—in English Literature in 1980. After graduating, Guite taught for several years as a secondary school teacher before deciding to seek a doctoral degree, and obtained his Doctor of Philosophy (PhD) from Durham University in 1993. His doctoral dissertation focused on "the centrality of memory as a theme in the sermons and meditations of Lancelot Andrewes and John Donne and to explore the extent of their influence on the treatment of memory in T.S. Eliots poetry". While researching the topic of his dissertation, in considering the struggles of John Donne with a similar question in the early seventeenth-century, Guite began to wonder if God was calling him too to be a priest.

Career 
Guite was ordained as a priest in the Church of England in 1991. As a deacon he was first assigned to a parish on "the Oxmoor estate in Huntingdon". He described this period as not having much time for writing sonnets, saying: "being a priest and a poet feels a very natural combination now. It didn’t at first".  He put poetry aside for seven years, "in order to concentrate on and learn deeply my priestly vocation, and life in my parishes was totally absorbing and demanding so it felt right to let the other fields lie fallow".

Guite teaches in the pastoral theology graduate programme at the Cambridge Theological Federation where he frequently advises "clergy who are returning to academia to do a dissertation to reflect on their often amazing parish experiences". From 2003 was chaplain and Bye-Fellow of Girton College, Cambridge. Guite also lectures regularly in the United States and Canada, including visiting positions at Duke University Divinity School and Regent College. As an academic, Guite describes the focus of his research interests as "the interface between theology and the arts, more specifically Theology and Literature" and "special interests in Coleridge and C. S. Lewis" as well as J. R. R. Tolkien and British poets. Since October 2014, Guite has been a visiting research fellow at St John's College, at Durham University.

Guite performs as a singer and guitarist fronting the Cambridgeshire-based blues, rhythm and blues, and rock band Mystery Train. He has collaborated with Canadian singer-songwriter Steve Bell for several tracks on a 4-CD set by Bell called Pilgrimage that was released in 2014 by Signpost Music.

In January 2017, Guite spoke as an interviewed guest on Radio 4's Great Lives Series, together with Suzannah Lipscomb, on how C. S. Lewis had inspired her life.

Guite writes the weekly "Poet's Corner" column for the Church Times. He has been also been interviewed several times on the paper's podcast.

Poetry and persona 

Guite's poetry has been characterised as modern-day metaphysical poems and psalms. Guite's poetry tends to conform to traditional forms, especially the sonnet, and employs both rhyme and metre. The former Archbishop of Canterbury, Rowan Williams, remarked that Guite "knows exactly how to use the sonnet form to powerful effect" and that his poems "offer deep resources for prayer and meditation to the reader". Concerning Guite's collection Sounding the Seasons, poet and literary critic Grevel Lindop remarked: "using the sonnet form with absolute naturalness as he traces the year and its festivals, he offers the reader—whether Christian or not—profound and beautiful utterance which is patterned but also refreshingly spontaneous". Guite has stated that his aim is to "be profound without ceasing to be beautiful". Further he has argued that a poet can discuss emotions like sorrow without having to lose form, and specifically that the goal of his style contrasts a lot of modern poetry which he states tends to be "quite difficult, jagged and rebarbative; a lot of modern poetry deliberately eschews form or beauty, and is almost deliberately trying to put the reader off." Citing these difficulties, Guite recounted that his entry into poetry was aided by engaging the lyrics of singer-songwriters Bob Dylan and Leonard Cohen.

Houston Baptist University professor Holly Ordway writes that "Guite helps us see clearly and deeply how poetry allows us to know truth in a different but complementary way to propositional, rational argument" in her review of Faith, Hope, and Poetry: Theology and the Poetic Imagination. In a review of Guite's collection The Singing Bowl, Kevin Belmonte, a Huffington Post contributor who has written biographies of William Wilberforce and G. K. Chesterton, describes Guite as a "questing poet" whose poems "point to places of possibility—in everything—from the commonplace to the transcendent" and explore "what it means to persist in the presence of a God who hears and knows us in time of trouble". Belmonte has further characterised Guite as a national treasure for England.

Guite has commented in interviews that he has been influenced by the works of poets Seamus Heaney, T. S. Eliot, and George Herbert, and that he holds Herbert's poem "Bitter-Sweet" dearly. In discussing the impact Herbert's poem has on his views, he said "what I see Herbert saying in that poem is that we take our passions, and sometimes our faults and our brokenness and our stains, and we let God anneal his story. So there's some point in which we become a window of grace". Guite has described himself in interviews as "a poet, priest, rock & roller, in any order you like, really. I'm the same person in all three." On 11 September 2014, Guite headlined a poetry reading as part of an art exhibition at the University of North Carolina at Greensboros Weatherspoon Art Museum. In the promotional materials for the event, organizers asked—describing the poet—"What would happen if John Donne or George Herbert journeyed to Middle Earth by way of San Francisco, took musical cues from Jerry Garcia and fashion tips from Bilbo Baggins, and rode back on a Harley?"

Works

Discography 
 2007: Malcolm Guite: The Green Man and other songs
 2011: Dancing through the Fire

Poetry 
 2002: Saying the Names
 2004: The Magic Apple Tree
 2012: Sounding the Seasons: Seventy sonnets for Christian year (Canterbury Press Norwich) 
 2013: The Singing Bowl (Canterbury Press Norwich) 
 2016: Parable and Paradox (Canterbury Press) 
 2019: After Prayer (Canterbury Press) 
 2021: David's Crown (Canterbury Press)

Christian theology and practice 
 2017: Mariner: A Voyage with Samuel Taylor Coleridge (Hodder & Stoughton)   
 2015: Waiting on the Word: A Poem a Day for Advent, Christmas, and Epiphany (Canterbury Press) 
 2014: Reflections for Lent 2015 (Church House Publishing)  (as chapter contributor)
 2014: Word in the Wilderness (Hymns Ancient & Modern Ltd)  (as editor)
 2012: Faith, Hope and Poetry: Theology and the Poetic Imagination (Ashgate, Ashgate Studies in Theology, Imagination and the Arts) 
 2008: What Do Christians Believe?: Belonging and Belief in Modern Christianity (Walker & Company) 
 2000: Beholding the Glory: Incarnation through the Arts, Jeremy S. Begbie (Editor), (Baker Academic)

See also 
 Metaphysical poets

References

External links 

 Official website
 Official Twitter account
 Official YouTube channel

Living people
1957 births
20th-century English poets
21st-century English poets
21st-century English male writers
20th-century English Anglican priests
21st-century English Anglican priests
20th-century English theologians
21st-century English theologians
Christian apologists
English male singer-songwriters
People educated at Haberdashers' Boys' School
People from Ibadan
Alumni of Pembroke College, Cambridge
Fellows of Girton College, Cambridge
Chaplains of Girton College, Cambridge
Nigerian people of British descent
Nigerian emigrants to Canada
Alumni of Durham University
20th-century English male writers
Poet priests